Park Hee-soo (Hangul: 박희수, Hanja: 朴熙洙; born July 13, 1983 in Daejeon) is a South Korean baseball coach who plays for the Samsung Lions in the Korea Baseball Organization. He bats right-handed and throws left-handed as relief pitcher.

Amateur career
While attending Daejeon High School, Park was selected for the South Korean national baseball team to compete at the 2001 Asian Junior Baseball Championship hosted by Taiwan.

Notable international careers

Professional career
After graduation from Dongguk University in 2006 Park started his pro season in the SK Wyverns. In his rookie season Park only appeared in five games as a left-handed specialist. After the 2006 season, Park entered Sangmu Baseball Team to serve two-year military service. Park came back to the Wyverns in 2010 but had a mediocre season posting a 4.58 ERA in 14 games as a relief pitcher.

In 2011, Park served primarily as a setup pitcher for closer Chong Tae-Hyon, typically pitching in the seventh and eighth innings of games before Chong pitched in the ninth. In the season, Park finished with a 1.88 ERA and 8 holds in 67 innings pitched.

Park had a career year in 2012, as he had an 8–1 record with a career-low 1.32 ERA and six saves in 65 games. Park also set a KBO league record with 34 holds, two more than the previous mark equaled by Kwon Oh-Joon with the Samsung Lions in 2006.

Notable international careers

External links 
 Career statistics and player information from Korea Baseball Organization

SSG Landers players
South Korean baseball players
1983 births
Living people
2013 World Baseball Classic players
2017 World Baseball Classic players
Sportspeople from Daejeon